The Dudley B. Menzies Bridge is a dedicated LRT bridge crossing the North Saskatchewan River in Edmonton, Alberta, Canada. Named after Edmonton engineer and politician Dudley Blair Menzies, the bridge was the "first concrete segmental box girder bridge in Western Canada". The main deck carries two tracks of the LRT system connecting Government Centre station and the University station. A walkway for pedestrians and bicycles hangs beneath the main spans of the bridge over the river.

The American Concrete Institute recognized the joint venture company that built the Dudley B. Menzies Bridge with an Award of Excellence for Design and Construction in Concrete.

Gallery

See also 
 List of crossings of the North Saskatchewan River
 Dudley Blair Menzies
 List of bridges in Canada

References

External links

 

Edmonton Light Rail Transit
Railway bridges in Alberta
Menzies
Bridges completed in 1993
Box girder bridges
Pedestrian bridges in Canada
Light rail bridges